On 23 December 2022, at least one policeman was killed and several others injured in a suicide attack in Islamabad's I-10 area. The reason for the attack is still unclear.

After the explosion, the law enforcement agency has cordoned off the area.

References

2022 in Pakistan
December 2020 events in Pakistan
Islamabad
2022 crimes in Pakistan
December 2022 crimes in Asia
Terrorist incidents in Pakistan in 2022